This Is Not Berlin (Spanish: Esto no es Berlín), is a 2019 Mexican drama film directed by Hari Sama. The film was presented on 25 January 2019 at the Sundance Festival, and it premiered on 21 June 2019 in Spain. Sama portrays the film as autobiographical, as it is inspired by his life in the 80s in Mexico.

Cast 
 Xabiani Ponce de León as Carlos
 José Antonio Toledano as Gera
 Mauro Sánchez Navarro as Nico
 Klaudia García as Maud
 Ximena Romo as Rita
 Américo Hollander as Tito
 Hari Sama as Esteban
 Marina de Tavira as Carolina
 Lumi Cavazos as Susana
 Fernando Álvarez Rebeil as Quiñones

Reception

Critical response
The site's critical consensus reads, "This Is Not Berlin uses one young man's sexual and cultural awakening as the fuel for a personal story with widely resonant themes."

Awards and nominations

Notes

References

External links 
 

Mexican drama films
2019 drama films
2019 films
2019 LGBT-related films
Mexican LGBT-related films
2010s Spanish-language films
2010s Mexican films